The Chelsea F.C.–Tottenham Hotspur F.C. rivalry is a rivalry between London-based professional association football clubs Chelsea and Tottenham Hotspur. Chelsea play their home games at Stamford Bridge, while Tottenham Hotspur play their home games at the Tottenham Hotspur Stadium.

Background
While Chelsea and Tottenham Hotspur never considered each other primary rivals, there has always been strong needle between the fans dating back to the 1967 FA Cup final. Matches between the two teams would often attract large attendances and would sometimes end up in violent clashes between supporters.

A 2012 survey has shown that Chelsea fans consider Tottenham to be their main rival, above Arsenal and Manchester United. In the same survey, it is shown that Tottenham fans still consider Chelsea their second rival, below Arsenal.

History
The first league meeting between the two teams took place on 18 December 1909 at Stamford Bridge as Tottenham only joined the Football League in 1908 and won promotion to the Football League First Division in 1909. The match was won by Chelsea 2–1. Both teams however struggled in the 1909–10 season, and they met again at White Hart Lane on 30 April 1910 in the final match of season, with both fighting for survival in Division One. Spurs beat Chelsea 2–1, sending Chelsea down, with the winning goal scored by former Chelsea player Percy Humphreys.

However, the rivalry itself dates back to the 1967 FA Cup final, which was the competition's first final to be contested between two teams from London, and is thus often dubbed the "Cockney Cup Final". Tottenham won the game 2–1 with over 100,000 people in attendance.

The rivalry was further ignited during the 1974–75 season, one in which Tottenham and Chelsea fought out a bitter battle against relegation from the First Division. Before the match, Tottenham were in the relegation zone and Chelsea were one point ahead of them. The tension of the match led to fans invading and fighting on the pitch before the game started. After a delayed start, Tottenham won the game 2–0. Chelsea failed to win either of their remaining two games and were ultimately relegated from the First Division with Tottenham staying up via a solitary point.

Since the 1990s, Chelsea became dominant in the meetings with Tottenham, and were unbeaten by their rivals for over a decade, culminating in a 6–1 win at White Hart Lane in the 1997–98 season. On 5 November 2006, Tottenham beat Chelsea 2–1 at White Hart Lane, ending a 16-year period without victory against the Blues in the league. Spurs did, however, beat Chelsea in 2002 during a 5–1 win in the second leg of the league cup after a 2–1 defeat at Stamford Bridge, resulting in an aggregate score of 6–3.

On 11 March 2007, Chelsea and Tottenham met in the FA Cup quarter-finals, with Chelsea coming to 3–3 down from 1–3 and earning a replay. The next day, hooligans of Tottenham and Chelsea clashed in the streets of London, a fight in which 10 fans were knifed. Chelsea eventually won the replay by 2–1, progressing in the semi-finals. In the next season, the two sides met in the 2008 Football League Cup final, with Tottenham winning the trophy after a 2–1 victory.

Prior to signing for Chelsea in 2013, Willian had attracted interest from Tottenham. He completed a medical at Tottenham before meeting with Chelsea, which caused confusion as to which club he would sign for. Willian claims Chelsea was his first preference and he would have only signed with Tottenham if the deal with Chelsea fell through. It is alleged that during Roman Abramovich's tenure as Chelsea owner, he refused to do any business with Tottenham.

On 1 March 2015, Chelsea won the 2015 Football League Cup final 2–0 against Tottenham, with goals provided by John Terry and Diego Costa. Chelsea fans made headlines for racist and anti-Semitic chants on the Underground after the match. After this final, Chelsea surpassed Tottenham in number of trophies won.

On 2 May 2016, Chelsea and Tottenham met at Stamford Bridge in an ill-tempered match that some would later call the 'Battle of Stamford Bridge'. The first two goals were scored by Harry Kane and Son Heung-min. In the second half, Gary Cahill and Eden Hazard scored the two goals for Chelsea. It ended as a 2–2 draw which automatically gave Leicester City their first ever Premier League title. This was arguably the closest Tottenham had ever come to winning the league since their last title in 1961 and since their last third-place finish in 1990. The match re-ignited the rivalry between the two clubs as players attacked each other on the pitch, resulting in nine yellow cards for Tottenham (a Premier League record for any team), another three for Chelsea, and Mousa Dembélé receiving a six-match suspension for violent conduct. As a result, both clubs had to face three FA charges and they were fined for failing to control their players.

On 4 January 2017, Tottenham beat Chelsea 2–0 at White Hart Lane, ending Chelsea's record 13 game winning streak in the Premier League. It brought Tottenham to within five points of Chelsea, who were leading the Premier League. Tottenham and Chelsea then went on to be the two title rivals in what was a two-horse race for the title, in which Chelsea eventually prevailed with 93 points to Tottenham's 86 points. Tottenham also lost to Chelsea in the FA Cup semi-final in the same season.

On 20 August 2017, Tottenham and Chelsea met early in the 2017–18 Premier League season, with Tottenham playing their first-ever home Premier League match at Wembley Stadium. Chelsea won the match 2–1 with two goals scored by Marcos Alonso, ending Tottenham's 19-game home Premier League unbeaten run. In the same season on 1 April 2018, Tottenham won away to Chelsea 3–1, with goals from Dele Alli and Christian Eriksen. This was Tottenham's first win in 28 years at Stamford Bridge.

On 22 December 2019, Chelsea played their first match at Tottenham's new stadium. The match, which Chelsea won 2–0 with a brace by Willian, received wide media coverage due to alleged racist behaviour by Tottenham fans, aimed at Chelsea's defender Antonio Rüdiger. A Chelsea supporter was also arrested for alleged racist abuse against Spurs player Son Heung-min, who was sent off for kicking Rüdiger after he fouled Son. It led to a call for government action on racism in football. However, no evidence of racist abuse against Rüdiger was found after a police investigation.

On 5 January 2022, Chelsea took on Tottenham in the League Cup semi-final first leg at Stamford Bridge, and won the match 2–0. A week later, Chelsea again beat Tottenham 1–0 in the second leg, booking a spot at Wembley for the final. On 23 January, Chelsea faced Tottenham again in a 2–0 win in the Premier League. The win meant that Chelsea had beaten Tottenham three times in the space of a month—the last Premier League team to achieve this feat was Aston Villa against Blackburn Rovers in January 2010. 

During a Premier League match at Stamford Bridge on 14 August 2022, Chelsea's manager Thomas Tuchel and Spurs manager Antonio Conte, who previously managed Chelsea, were both sent off following multiple altercations on the touchline, initially when Conte celebrated in front of Tuchel following a Spurs equaliser, and later when both managers clashed whilst shaking hands after the final whistle. The match resulted in a 2–2 draw following a 96th minute equaliser from Spurs striker Kane. After the match, Tuchel was particularly critical of referee Anthony Taylor, whom he felt had missed crucial calls that preceded both of Tottenham's goals.

Honours

Highest attendances 

 100,000, Tottenham 2–1 Chelsea, 20 May 1967, FA Cup, Wembley
 89,294, Chelsea 2–0 Tottenham, 1 March 2015, Football League Cup, Wembley
 87,660, Chelsea 1–2 Tottenham, 24 February 2008, Football League Cup, Wembley
 86,355, Chelsea 4–2 Tottenham, 22 April 2017, FA Cup, Wembley
 85,731, Tottenham 1–5 Chelsea, 15 April 2012, FA Cup, Wembley
 76,000, Chelsea 0–4 Tottenham, 16 October 1920, First Division, Stamford Bridge
 73,587, Tottenham 1–2 Chelsea, 20 August 2017, Premier League, Wembley
 70,123, Chelsea 2–0 Tottenham, 8 January 1964, FA Cup, Stamford Bridge                       
 66,398, Tottenham 4–0 Chelsea, 26 January 1957, FA Cup, White Hart Lane

See also

North London derby
West London derby
Chelsea F.C.–Leeds United F.C. rivalry
Arsenal F.C.–Chelsea F.C. rivalry

References
General

Specific

Tottenham Hotspur
Chelsea
England football derbies
London derbies